Tiago Miguel Pinho Jogo (born 23 April 1991) is a Portuguese footballer who plays for S.C. Olhanense as a midfielder.

External links

1991 births
Living people
Portuguese footballers
Association football midfielders
Primeira Liga players
Liga Portugal 2 players
C.D. Feirense players
S.C. Farense players
S.C. Olhanense players
F.C. Felgueiras 1932 players